Alan Zaurbekovich Dzutsev (born 24 November 1991) is a former Russian professional football player.

Club career
He made his Russian Football National League debut for FC Alania Vladikavkaz on 19 September 2009 in a game against FC Metallurg Lipetsk. He also appeared in the FNL for FC Nizhny Novgorod.

He played one game for the main squad of FC Shinnik Yaroslavl in the Russian Cup.

Namesake
Sometimes, different sites mixed him with other footballer, Alan Dzutsev from Ukraine, merging information about both.

References

External links
 
 
 Career summary by sportbox.ru

1991 births
Sportspeople from Vladikavkaz
Living people
Russian footballers
Association football midfielders
FC Spartak Vladikavkaz players
FC Nizhny Novgorod (2007) players
FC Shinnik Yaroslavl players
FC Mashuk-KMV Pyatigorsk players